Prebbleton is a small town in the Selwyn District in the Canterbury Region of New Zealand. It is 11 km southwest of the centre of Christchurch and about 2 km south of the outlying industrial suburb of Hornby.

Prebbleton dates back to 1855, making it one of the earliest settlements on the Canterbury Plains. The Prebble brothers, originally from Kent, England, settled in the district.

The village has experienced considerable growth with several subdivisions built in the last two decades.

Demographics 

Prebbleton had a population of 4,515 at the 2018 New Zealand census, an increase of 1,743 people (62.9%) since the 2013 census, and an increase of 2,514 people (125.6%) since the 2006 census. There were 1,497 households and 42 unoccupied private dwellings. There were 2,235 males and 2,277 females, giving a sex ratio of 0.98 males per female. The median age was 40.6 years (compared with 37.4 years nationally), with 1,059 people (23.5%) aged under 15 years, 651 (14.4%) aged 15 to 29, 2,319 (51.4%) aged 30 to 64, and 486 (10.8%) aged 65 or older.

Ethnicities were 91.7% European/Pākehā, 5.2% Māori, 0.7% Pacific peoples, 6.5% Asian, and 1.7% other ethnicities (totals add to more than 100% since people could identify with multiple ethnicities).

The proportion of people born overseas was 18.6%, compared with 27.1% nationally.

Although some people objected to giving their religion, 52.9% had no religion, 40.8% were Christian, 0.3% were Hindu, 0.1% were Muslim, 0.3% were Buddhist and 1.3% had other religions.

Of those at least 15 years old, 960 (27.8%) people had a bachelor or higher degree, and 357 (10.3%) people had no formal qualifications. The median income was $48,600, compared with $31,800 nationally. The employment status of those at least 15 was that 1,983 (57.4%) people were employed full-time, 636 (18.4%) were part-time, and 69 (2.0%) were unemployed.

Education
Prebbleton School is a full primary school catering for years 1 to 8.

References

Selwyn District
Populated places in Canterbury, New Zealand